The 2012–13 Hershey Bears season is the franchise's 76th season in the American Hockey League, which began on October 5, 2013. It marked the first season with Mike Haviland as head coach, having replaced Mark French. Efforts were made to establish a more aggressive, better-balanced team, and 40 percent of the roster were new players once the season began.

Off-season
Follow Hershey's first-round elimination from the 2013 Calder Cup playoffs, it was announced Mark French would not be retained as the Bears head coach, a position he had held four years. He subsequently became head coach of KHL Medveščak Zagreb for the Kontinental Hockey League. Several people were identified as possible candidates to succeed French, including Troy Mann, Paul Jerrard, Mike Stothers, Eric Veilleux and Larry Courville. After a search, it was announced on June 18 that Mike Haviland had been chosen for the position. Bears President Doug Yingst said Haviland was chosen because it was believed he could improve Hershey's home record and create a more aggressive, better-balanced, "in your face" team. Haviland had applied for the Washington Capitals head coach position the year prior, but Adam Oates was selected instead. Troy Mann also departed from his position as Hershey's assistant coach for a job as head coach of ECHL's Bakersfield Condors. He had re-interviewed for his position with the Bears and felt it went well, but said he faced a deadline to accept the Bakersfield job and could not turn it down. Ryan Mougenel was signed as Mann's replacement on July 5. He had previously worked with Haviland, when Mougenel was alternate captain on and Haviland was head coach of the ECHL's Atlantic City Boardwalk Bullies in 2002–03, the year the team won the Kelly Cup.

Several players departed from the Hershey roster during the off season. After 365 games with Hershey and playing as captain since 2001, Boyd Kane left to join French with the Medveščak Zagreb. Dane Byers was named the new captain, with Garrett Mitchell and Jeff Taffe as alternate captains. Barry Almeida, Alex Berry, Mike Carman, Jon Kalinski, Jon DiSalvatore, Danick Paquette, Matt Pope, Ryan Potulny, Dany Sabourin and Mattias Sjögren also left the team, as did Patrick McNeill, who was limited to 47 games in the 2012-13 season due to veteran roster limits. Joey Crabb, who had come to Hershey mid-season from the Washington Capitals after clearing waivers, signed with the Florida Panthers. Byers, Joel Rechlicz, Ryan Stoa, T.J. Syner and Patrick Wellar were all re-signed for the 2013–14 season, and Nicolas Deschamps and Peter LeBlanc received qualifying offers from the Washington Capitals. It was announced June 14 that Taffe re-signed with the Bears. The Swedish Hockey League had announced one month earlier that Taffe had signed a contract with them, but Taffe said that announcement had been premature, and he wanted to keep his family in North America. Hershey signed several new players for the 2013–14 season, including defensemen Nate Schmidt, David Kolomatis and Tyson Strachan; goaltender David Leggio; and forwards Josh Brittain, Michal Čajkovský, Dustin Gazley, Tyler Ruegsegger, Brandon Segal, Matt Watkins, Derek Whitmore, and Jamie Johnson, a former linemate of Taffe's with the Rochester Americans. The Bears also signed forward Nathan Walker, making him the first Australian to play for the American Hockey League. Several Hershey players were released the ECHL's Reading Royals after training camp, including Syner, Brandon Anderson, Mike Banwell, Brett Flemming, Dustin Gazley, Riley Gill, Ryan Kavanagh, David Marshall and Domenic Monardo.

By the end of the off-season, 40 percent of Hershey's new roster were new players. The Bears training camp was held from September 23 to 26 at Hersheypark Arena, followed by a three-game exhibition season that began with a 6–0 shutout victory over the Utica Comets on September 27. Leggio made 25 saves, and Hershey had six successful penalty kills against Utica. Brittain suffered a left arm injury in the game, which could keep him sidelined for the first month of the regular season. The Bears also defeated Wilkes-Barre/Scranton Penguins 6–1 on September 28; Marshall had two goals and two assists, as well as one fight, which gave him a Gordie Howe hat trick. Hershey lost their September 29 preseason finale 2–1, also against the Penguins, with Stoa scoring Hershey's only goal. Hershey went 3-for-16 in the power play in the three exhibition games.

Regular season

October
Hershey lost their first three games of the season for the first time since 2007–08. They lost their October 5 season opener to the Adirondack Phantoms 4–3 after allowing two goals against on rebounds in the first four minutes. Hershey scored three unanswered goals in the second period, but ultimately lost in overtime. The Capitals recalled Nate Schmidt on October 11 to fill in for an injured John Erskine, and sent down to Hershey rookie defenseman Connor Carrick, who starting three games with Washington. The Bears lost 3–1 to the Penguins the next day, allowing two goals against in the final three minutes of the game. Hershey then split a pair of away games against the St. John's IceCaps, losing the first on October 18 by 5–1. Taffe scored the team's sole goal, breaking a 0-for-14 power play streak.

The Bears secured their first win of the season the next day, with Grubauer stopping all 30 shots in a 4–0 shutout. Dmitry Orlov scored a goal and three assists, his first game with more than two points since November 19, 2011. Hershey lost their second straight home game on October 26 with a 4–3 defeat against the Hartford Wolf Pack, surrendering two leads and failing to score on two five-on-three power play goals, including one that lasted 2:56. Hershey recorded their first home victory on the next day with a 4–2 win over Norfolk, with David Leggio making 17 saves in his first victory for the Bears. They outshot the Admirals 38-19, marking the first time Hershey outshot an opponent all season. Nathan Walker scored his first professional goal, making him the first Australian-born player to score in the AHL. The Bears lost their two leading scorers on October 30, as Orlov and Michael Latta were recalled to the Washington Capitals.

November
Hershey lost their next three games, starting with a home-and-home series against the Penguins on November 1 and 2, dropping the first after winger Matt Watkins missed a penalty shot in overtime, and Wilkes-Barre/Scranton scored with 25 seconds left in the extra period. The Bears lost the second game despite Leggio making 38 saves and Hershey scoring twice in their first three shots, just two minutes apart. In their 4–3 loss against Norfolk on November 3, the Bears scored three goals in three minutes during regulation, but failed to connect on the shootout. Orlov, having just returned from Washington, scored a goal and assist, leaving him tied for eighth in the league for defensemen with eight points, and first for shooting at 40 percent. He was sent back to the Capitals after one day back with Hershey. The Bears were successful in all 10 penalty kills over their past two games, bringing it to sixth-best in the league at 85.7 percent, although their power play was ranked 27th of 30 at 12 percent. Having won only one of five home games so far, Mike Haviland believed the team needed to stop feeling so comfortable on home ice.

Standings

Conference standings

Schedule and results

Player statistics

Skaters
Note: GP = Games played; G = Goals; A = Assists; Pts = Points; +/− = Plus/minus; PIM = Penalty minutes
Updated as of November 3, 2013 

†Denotes player spent time with another team before joining team. Stats reflect time with the team only.
‡Left the team mid-season
*Rookie

Goaltenders
Note: GP = Games played; TOI = Time on Ice; W = Wins; L = Losses; GA = Goals against; GAA = Goals against average; SV = Saves; SA = Shots against; SV% = Save percentage; SO = Shutouts; G = Goals; A = Assists; PIM = Penalty minutes
Updated as of November 3, 2013

‡Left the team mid-season
*Rookie

Milestones

References

External links
Hershey Bears official site

Hersh
Hershey Bears
Hershey